was a Japanese industrial designer. He played a role in Japanese modern design developed after World War II to the high-growth period in the Japanese economy. He is both a representative of the wholly Japanese modern designer and a full-blown modernist who merged simplicity and practicality with elements of traditional Japanese crafts.

Early life
Yanagi was born in 1915 in Tokyo, Japan. His father is Yanagi Sōetsu, founder of the Japanese folk crafts mingei movement, which celebrated the beauty of everyday objects, and the Japanese Folk Crafts Museum (Nihon Mingeikan). Sōri entered Tokyo Art School (now, Tokyo University of the Arts) in 1934, where he studied both art and architecture.

Career 

He was influenced by Le Corbusier as well as by Charlotte Perriand, whom he translated for when she was in Tokyo during the early 1940s. Perriand introduced him to product design, and his interests later moved from painting to buildings to design and objects. Most of Yanagi's designs are very simple and beautiful. His products illustrate his thinking: true beauty is not made, it is born naturally. When he created a new product, he made the first versions over and over by hand, seeking new forms that took shape from both new and old ideas.

After World War II, he designed many products: furniture, three-wheeled vehicles, Olympic cauldrons, pedestrian overpasses, etc. One of the most famous pieces of furniture is his Butterfly Stool which won a gold prize at the Milan Triennial XI. Announced in 1956, its 2-piece form has been compared to a butterfly's open wings. Alternately, the shape can be seen as the gateway of a Shinto shrine or even an antique samurai helmet. In effect, it is a form that is both modern and timeless, that has won critical acclaim and prizes, and is included in major collections such as the Museum of Modern Art New York and the Ruble Museum.

Yanagi designed the official torch for the 1972 Winter Olympics in Sapporo, Japan.

Sōri Yanagi died in 2011 at the age of 96.

Key Designs
Elephant Stool, 1954
Butterfly Stool, 1956

Honours
 Honorary Royal Designer for Industry (UK), 2008

References

External links 

People from Tokyo
Japanese designers
Japanese furniture designers
1915 births
2011 deaths
Recipients of the Medal with Purple Ribbon
Mingei